Bruce Hunter (born 1961) is a Canadian actor and comedian from Calgary, Alberta. He has appeared in television shows such as Puppets Who Kill and The Red Green Show. Hunter received a Canadian Comedy Awards nomination in 2002 for his work on the television series After Hours. He voices the king of Happily-Ever-Afterville on the PBS show Cyberchase.

He is a member of the internationally renowned comedy troupe Illustrated Men along with David Huband and Adrian Truss.

Hunter also voiced X-5 on the Teletoon and Cartoon Network show Atomic Betty.

References

External links

1961 births
Living people
Canadian male voice actors
Canadian comedy writers
Canadian male comedians
Male actors from Calgary
Writers from Calgary
Comedians from Alberta
Canadian Comedy Award winners